Nial Smith (born 22 October 1995) is a Guyanese cricketer. He made his List A debut on 11 November 2019, for Guyana in the 2019–20 Regional Super50 tournament. He made his first-class debut on 9 January 2020, for Guyana in the 2019–20 West Indies Championship. He made his Twenty20 debut on 28 August 2021, for the Guyana Amazon Warriors in the 2021 Caribbean Premier League.

References

External links
 

1995 births
Living people
Guyanese cricketers
Guyana cricketers
Guyana Amazon Warriors cricketers
Place of birth missing (living people)